The IWA World Women's Championship was a major women's professional wrestling title in All Japan Women's Pro-Wrestling. It had its origins with Stampede Wrestling in Calgary, Alberta in 1987.

Title history

See also

 List of professional wrestling promotions in Japan
 List of women's wrestling promotions
 Professional wrestling in Japan

References

External links
IWA World Women's title history

All Japan Women's Pro-Wrestling Championships
World professional wrestling championships
Women's professional wrestling championships